This is a list of the winners of the Bavarian Film Awards Prize for Best Cinematography.

1981 Jost Vacano
1984 Robby Müller
1985 Xaver Schwarzenberger
1986 Gerard Vandenberg
1988 Jürgen Jürges
1990 Axel Block
1991 Gernot Roll
1992 Joseph Vilsmaier
1994 Jörg Widmer
1995 Michael Epp
1996 Carl-Friedrich Koschnick
1997 Tom Fährmann
1998 Carl-Friedrich Koschnick
1999 Edward Kłosiński
2000 Rainer Klausmann
2001 Martin Langer
2002 Judith Kaufmann
2003 Franz Rath
2004 Jürgen Jürges
2005 Hans-Günther Bücking
2006 Andreas Höfer
2007 Benedict Neuenfels

References
https://www.stmd.bayern.de/wp-content/uploads/2020/08/Bayerische-Filmpreisträger-bis-2020.pdf

Awards for best cinematography
Bavarian film awards